Thomas Banister Russell (born 1945) is a senior United States district judge of the United States District Court for the Western District of Kentucky and is also served a term as a Judge on the United States Foreign Intelligence Surveillance Court. He served the Alien Terrorist Removal Court from 2016 to 2021.

Education and career

Born in Louisville, Kentucky, Russell received a Bachelor of Arts degree from Western Kentucky University in 1967 and a Juris Doctor from the University of Kentucky College of Law in 1970. He was in private practice in Paducah, Kentucky from 1970 to 1994.

Federal judicial service

On September 14, 1994, Russell was nominated by President Bill Clinton to a seat on the United States District Court for the Western District of Kentucky vacated by Edward Huggins Johnstone. Russell was confirmed by the United States Senate on October 7, 1994, and received his commission on October 11, 1994. He served as Chief Judge from 2008 to 2011. He took senior status on November 15, 2011. He is now one of the 13 Federal Judges of the United States Foreign Intelligence Surveillance Court. He was appointed on May 19, 2015 by Chief Justice John Roberts. In 2016, he was appointed to the Alien Terrorist Removal Court.

References

Sources

1945 births
Judges of the United States District Court for the Western District of Kentucky
Living people
Lawyers from Louisville, Kentucky
People from Paducah, Kentucky
United States district court judges appointed by Bill Clinton
University of Kentucky College of Law alumni
Western Kentucky University alumni
Judges of the United States Foreign Intelligence Surveillance Court
20th-century American judges
21st-century American judges